Wreck and Reference is an experimental rock group based in Los Angeles, California. They compose their sound as experimentation with vocal styles over electronic instrumentation using samples, synthesizers and acoustics. The group has been associated with San Francisco-based record label The Flenser.

History 
Wreck and Reference (sometimes stylized as Wreck & Reference or W&R) started out as a garage project in Davis, CA in 2009. The band began drawing mainstream attention after the release of the Y̶o̶u̶t̶h̶  LP and the C̶o̶n̶t̶e̶n̶t̶  EP (pronounced "No Youth" and "No Content") in 2012. In 2014, their second full-length album Want was featured on "The Best Metal Albums of 2014" list by Pitchfork. Want was followed by a 75-track, online-only release of the samples used to create the electronic instrumentals on the record.

Members 
 Felix Skinner - vocals, production
 Ignat Frege - vocals, production, drums

Discography 
Studio albums
 Y̶o̶u̶t̶h̶  (2012)
 Want (2014)
 Indifferent Rivers Romance End (2016)
 Absolute Still Life (2019)
EPs
 Black Cassette (2011)
 Black Cassette (Remastered) (2011)
 C̶o̶n̶t̶e̶n̶t̶  (2013)
 Spill/Fill (2014)
Misc.
 Alien Pains (2018)

References 

American avant-garde metal musical groups